Argyripnus iridescens, also known as the pearlyside lightfish or brilliant pearlside, is a species of oceanic ray-finned fish in the genus Argyipnus. It lives in deep-water environments across the Southwest Pacific.

References

Fish described in 1926
Taxa named by Allan Riverstone McCulloch
Sternoptychidae